Lucienne Claudine Berthieu-Poiraud (born March 31, 1978 in Douala) is a French-Cameroonian women's basketball player. She played in the WNBA in the United States from 2002–2004 with the Cleveland Rockers and Houston Comets. In 43 games, she averaged 3 points and 1.7 rebounds per game. She played college basketball at Old Dominion University and internationally with France. She lives in Rennes.

References

1978 births
Living people
Cameroonian women's basketball players
Cleveland Rockers players
French expatriate basketball people in the United States
French sportspeople of Cameroonian descent
French women's basketball players
Houston Comets players
Old Dominion Monarchs women's basketball players
Seattle Storm draft picks
Sportspeople from Douala
Sportspeople from Rennes